The Matarbari Power Plant is a 1,200 megawatt (2x600) coal-fired power station under construction in Maheshkhali Upazila of Cox's Bazar District in southeastern Bangladesh.

See also

Electricity sector in Bangladesh
List of power stations in Bangladesh

References

External links

Fossil fuel power stations in Bangladesh
Proposed coal-fired power stations
Proposed power stations in Bangladesh
Proposed buildings and structures in Bangladesh
Coal in Bangladesh
Coal-fired power stations in Bangladesh